Come Home to Me may refer to:

 "Come Home to Me" (Miki Howard song), 1990
 "Come Home to Me", a 1991 song from And Along Came Jones by George Jones
 Come Home to Me, a 2014 novel of the Homefront series by Jessica Scott
 "Come Home to Me", a 2015 song from Country Girl (Rebecca Hollweg album)